Janusz Dziedzic (born 17 August 1980) is a Polish former football striker.

Career

Club
In July 2011, he joined Olimpia Grudziądz.

References

External links
 

1980 births
Living people
Polish footballers
GKS Bełchatów players
Arka Gdynia players
ŁKS Łódź players
Zagłębie Sosnowiec players
Pogoń Szczecin players
GKS Katowice players
Olimpia Grudziądz players
Wisła Płock players
Ekstraklasa players
People from Dębica
Sportspeople from Podkarpackie Voivodeship
Association football forwards